A basset is a short-legged type of scenthound. 

Basset may also refer to:

Breeds of dog
 Basset Artésien Normand
 Basset Bleu de Gascogne
 Basset Fauve de Bretagne
 Basset Hound
 Grand Basset Griffon Vendéen
 Petit Basset Griffon Vendéen

Music 

 Basset clarinet, a soprano member of the clarinet family with an extended range to written low C
 Basset horn (or basset-horn), an alto-tenor member of the clarinet family with an extended range to written low C 
 Basset recorder, a historic term for a bass recorder
 Hohner Basset, a musical instrument, a keyboard bass from the 1960s
 Nicolo basset, a musical instrument, a type of shawm

People
Basset (surname)

Other
Basset (card game)
Basset force, a hydrodynamics term
Bassetlaw, the northernmost district of Nottinghamshire, England
Beagle Basset, British military communications aircraft
Fred Basset, a UK-based comic strip

See also
Bassett (disambiguation)
Bissett (disambiguation)